The 1981 James Madison Dukes football team was an American football team that represented James Madison University during the 1981 NCAA Division I-AA football season as an independent. In their tenth year under head coach Challace McMillin, the team compiled a 3–8 record.

Schedule

Roster

References

James Madison
James Madison Dukes football seasons
James Madison Dukes football